Abdolmajid Eskandari is an Iranian that serves as the Director General of the Office of International Relations, University of Tehran. He is a graduate of English Language and Literature who has been serving in the Office of International Relations, University of Tehran, Iran for more than 32 years. 

Eskandari is a translator, and researcher with more than one thousand published translated articles and research papers in local and international newspapers and journals as well. He has participated in a great number of national and international conferences and presented scholarly papers.

References

https://international.ut.ac.ir/en/page/8687/abdolmajid-eskandari

https://scholar.google.com/citations?user=0ZXiwhYAAAAJ&hl=en&oi=ao

University of Tehran alumni
Academic staff of the University of Tehran
Living people
Year of birth missing (living people)